Adam Ševčík (born 24 January 1993) is a Czech footballer who last played as a striker for Bayern Hof.

Youth career

Sigma Olomouc
Ševčík started his career with Sigma Olomouc. Ševčík was part of the squad of players born in 1993 that managed to win the U-17 as well as the U-19 Czech National Youth league. Adam Ševčík belonged to the key members of this victorious squad, scoring many important goals upon winning the titles.

Club career

Sigma Olomouc
Ševčík made his debut for Sigma Olomouc in a friendly match on 12 July 2014, coming on as a substitute in the 64th minute in a 2–1 victory against the IFA international football team.

Loan to 1. SC Znojmo
On 30 January 2013 Ševčík was loaned out to Znojmo. At the age of 19 Adam Ševčík made persuasive performances, contributing to Znojmo's promotion to the Czech First League.

Loan to FC Nitra
On 1 July 2013 Ševčík was loaned out to Nitra playing the Slovak top division. Ševčík made his Corgoň Liga debut in a 4:0 loss against AS Trenčín. Ševčík went on to play 7 matches during his loan spell in Slovakia.

Loan to SK Hanácká Slavia Kroměříž
In August 2014, Ševčík was sent on loan to Hanácká Slavia Kroměříž for the fall part of the 2014/2015 season.

International career

Czech Republic U19
On 17 April 2012 Ševčík was called up for U-19 Czech National team. He made his debut in a 0:0 draw against Germany.

References

External links
 
 Profile at Czech Football Association
 
 Adam Ševčík at FuPa

1993 births
Living people
Sportspeople from Olomouc
Czech footballers
Czech expatriate footballers
Czech Republic youth international footballers
Association football defenders
SK Sigma Olomouc players
1. SC Znojmo players
FC Nitra players
FK Frýdek-Místek players
FK Baník Sokolov players
1. SK Prostějov players
SpVgg Bayern Hof players
Czech First League players
Czech National Football League players
Slovak Super Liga players
Bayernliga players
Czech expatriate sportspeople in Germany
Czech expatriate sportspeople in Slovakia
Expatriate footballers in Germany
Expatriate footballers in Slovakia